The League for the Fifth International (L5I) is an international grouping of revolutionary Trotskyist organisations around a common programme and perspectives.

History 
L5I was founded as the Movement for a Revolutionary Communist International. Its first member groups were Workers' Power in Britain, the Irish Workers Group, Pouvoir Ouvrier in France, and Gruppe Arbeitermacht (GAM) in Germany. After a congress in 1989 the organisation adopted a common programme, the Trotskyist Manifesto, and a democratic centralist constitution, under which each national section agreed to be bound by the decisions of the international organisation as a whole.

Publications 

The League publishes a quarterly English-language journal entitled Fifth International. The majority of writers for this appear to be from the British group, although other sections publish journals in their own languages. Revolutionärer Marxismus is the German-language journal. The League previously published the journal "Permanent Revolution", a more theoretical journal which looked at tactics that communist organisations use, theories of imperialism, and similar questions. This was followed by "Trotskyist International" which, although still theoretical, also looked more at current affairs.

Member organisations 

The L5I also has individual members in Ireland and Lebanon.

Groups that share a common history with L5I

See also 
 List of Trotskyist internationals
 Revolution (political group)

References

External links 
Official website
REVOLUTION